Amauri Ribeiro (born January 23, 1959), known as Amauri, is a Brazilian former volleyball player who competed in the 1980 Summer Olympics, in the 1984 Summer Olympics, in the 1988 Summer Olympics, and in the 1992 Summer Olympics.

In 1980, he was part of the Brazilian team which finished fifth in the Olympic tournament. He played all six matches.

Four years later, he won the silver medal with the Brazilian team in the 1984 Olympic tournament. He played five matches.

At the 1988, Games he was a member of the Brazilian team which finished fourth in the Olympic tournament. He played all seven matches again.

His final Olympic appearance was in Barcelona when he won the gold medal with the Brazilian team in the 1992 Olympic tournament. He played two matches.

References
 
 globo.com 

1959 births
Living people
Brazilian men's volleyball players
Olympic volleyball players of Brazil
Volleyball players at the 1980 Summer Olympics
Volleyball players at the 1984 Summer Olympics
Volleyball players at the 1988 Summer Olympics
Volleyball players at the 1992 Summer Olympics
Olympic gold medalists for Brazil
Olympic silver medalists for Brazil
Olympic medalists in volleyball
Brazilian volleyball coaches
Medalists at the 1992 Summer Olympics
Medalists at the 1984 Summer Olympics
Sportspeople from São Paulo